Stage 2 of the Cambrian is the unnamed upper stage of the Terreneuvian Series. It lies atop the Fortunian and below Stage 3 of the Cambrian. It is commonly referred to as the Tommotian, after the Cambrian stratigraphy of Siberia. Neither the upper nor lower boundary has yet been defined by the International Commission on Stratigraphy. 
The preferred definitions for the lower boundary are the first appearance of the molluscs Watsonella crosbyi or Aldanella attleborensis around  million years ago. The proposed upper boundary might be the first appearance of trilobites around  million years ago.

Possible candidates for a GSSP include the first appearance of Watsonella crosbyi in the Zhujiaqing Formation (朱家庆组) in Yunnan, China or the Pestrotsvet Formation near the Aldan River on the Siberian Platform.

References

Cambrian geochronology
Geological ages
Terreneuvian